Ulf Harry Peter Andersson (born 12 February 1953) is a Swedish actor, famous in Denmark for his role as the Faroese in the 2000 film Flickering Lights.

Filmography

External links 
 

Swedish male film actors
1953 births
Living people
Actors from Gothenburg